Omar El Torkey (born 1 February 2001, in Giza) is an Egyptian professional squash player. As of July 2021, he was ranked number 362 in the world.

References

2001 births
Living people
Egyptian male squash players
21st-century Egyptian people